Inspecteur Lavardin is a 1986 crime film co-written and directed by Claude Chabrol. It is the sequel to his 1984 film Cop au vin.

Synopsis
The titular inspector travels to a small coastal town to investigate the puzzling death of a devout and wealthy Roman Catholic writer who is found murdered on a beach with the word pig written on his back. When Inspector Lavardin arrives to investigate, he discovers that the widow, Helene, is an old flame he hasn't seen in 20 years. In the course of his probings, Lavardin inadvertently uncovers several metaphorical skeletons in the closet.

Principal cast

Production
External shots were filmed in Dinard and Dinan. The film was co-written by Claude Chabrol (the writer behind Cop Au Vin) and Dominique Roulet.

Critical reception
From Caryn James of The New York Times:

From Fred Camper of The Chicago Reader:

References

External links

1986 films
1980s mystery films
French mystery films
Swiss mystery films
Films directed by Claude Chabrol
Police detective films
French sequel films
1980s crime films
1980s French-language films
French-language Swiss films
1980s French films